Luehea divaricata is a species of tree native to the cerrado area of Brazil, particularly the states of Bahia and Rio Grande do Sul. It is known by various local names including "açoita-cavalo", "açoita-cavalo miúdo", "ibatingui", "ivatingui", "pau-de-canga", and "caiboti".

Traditional uses
Luehea divaricata is regarded as a medicinal plant in traditional Brazilian medicine. The stems are used to relieve inflammation, the leaves are used as a diuretic while a bark decoction is used in the treatment of arthritis. The wood can also be fashioned into whips.

References

External links
Kew Gardens database: Luehea divaricata

Grewioideae
Endemic flora of Brazil
Trees of Brazil
Flora of the Atlantic Forest
Flora of the Cerrado
Flora of Bahia
Flora of Rio Grande do Sul
Plants described in 1824
Medicinal plants of South America